The traditional kitchen garden, vegetable garden, also known as a potager (from the French ) or in Scotland a kailyaird, is a space separate from the rest of the residential garden – the ornamental plants and lawn areas. It is used for growing edible plants and often some medicinal plants, especially historically. The plants are grown for domestic use; though some seasonal surpluses are given away or sold, a commercial operation growing a variety of vegetables is more commonly termed a market garden (or a farm). The kitchen garden is different not only in its history, but also its functional design. It differs from an allotment in that a kitchen garden is on private land attached or very close to the dwelling.  It is regarded as essential that the kitchen garden could be quickly accessed by the cook.   

Historically, most small country gardens were probably mainly or entirely used as kitchen gardens, but in large country houses the kitchen garden was a segregated area, normally rectangular and enclosed by a wall or hedge, walls being useful for training fruit trees as well as offering shelter from wind.  Such large examples very often included greenhouses and furnace-heated hothouses for more tender delicacies, and also flowers for display in the house; an orangery was the ultimate type.  In large houses, the kitchen garden was typically placed diagonally to the rear and side of the house, not impeding the views from the front and rear facades, but still quick to access.  In some cases, hardy flowers for cutting were grown outside there, rather than in the flower garden.   A large country house hardly expected to buy any vegetables, herbs or fruit, and the surplus was often distributed as presents; the walled example at Croome Court in England covers seven acres, and the gardens have a large "Temple Greenhouse", an orangery in the form of a Roman Temple.  

A symbol of American self-sufficiency and the colonial homestead, practical kitchen gardens were the center of home life in early America. In Europe, especially Britain, the difficulties in food supply during World War II resulted in a huge, if temporary, upsurge in growing vegetables in small gardens, with much encouragement from the government Ministry of Food.  In modern gardening, there has been interest in integrating the growing of food plants within a mainly ornamental garden; fruit trees and cooking herbs are the simplest and most popular expression of this.

Visibility

In large country house gardens, the walls also served to hide the kitchen garden, as "a place of base labour ... from the more polite areas", which included the often very extensive fruit gardens and orchards.  The gardeners were often, depending on the season, the number of guests, and the whim of the owner, expected to keep out of the main "best garden" during the fairly predictable parts of the day when the family and guests were likely to be walking in the garden, and the kitchen garden provided somewhere for them to occupy themselves at these times. Mostly, visitors were probably not expected to venture inside without leave.  But some owners, from Louis XIV downwards, liked to show guests the kitchen garden, especially if they knew they had an interest. In the gardens of Versailles, the enormous potager area, not contiguous with the main gardens, had a wall that was thick enough for visitors to accompany the king in walking along the top for a better view, as on castle battlements.

History
The French doctor and printer, Charles Estienne, wrote in detail about the 16th century kitchen garden in Maison Rustique; his book was largely compiled from classical authors.  This practical garden was to be separated from the pleasure gardens, enclosed by a thick hedge or wall. Estienne viewed hedges as more resilient, cost effective and were easier to repair and maintain, but at least in later periods, walls seem to have been more usual; some were hot walls, with a central cavity gently heated by furnaces.  Certainly walls leave more traces behind for the garden archaeologist.  The hedge, Estienne says, can be planted with red and white gooseberry bushes, medlar and olive trees, woodbine, whitethorn, wild apples, brambles, and eglantiness. Lattices were woven from willow branches and every year renewed, unless made with juniper poles that had been reinforced with charred oak.

In the Middle Ages, the kitchen garden was often a separate enclosure some way away from the main house. The Covent Garden area of London got its name as the kitchen garden for Westminster Abbey, though some distance from the abbey itself. In Renaissance times, the kitchen garden was rather close to the house, but by the mid-17th-century many were being moved further away, with a service road leading to the main house. At Versailles a public road needs to be crossed to reach it.

In the UK, by the 19th century, as the breeding of vegetable cultivars greatly increased, a plethora of magazines, societies and competitions in local or county fairs, supported what had become (and remains) a popular form of specialist gardening. Some gardeners concentrated on mere size, leading to monstrous (and largely tasteless) strains of vegetables such as leeks. The new allotments, small pieces of a plot of land made available by local councils or charities, often specified that only edible plants were to be grown.

Plants

According to Estienne, of the planted crops, turnips required the most room, and planted next to these were coleworts, and a path leading to plots of sorrel, arugula, parsley, spinach, beets, and orach, then separated from the greens another path to the root vegetables, leeks, onions, garlic, carrots, and scallions, and so on for edible flowers and winter potherbs like thyme, sage, lavender, rosemary, hyssop, southern wormwood, savoury, lemon balm, basil, costmary, spikenard, chamomile, and pennyroyal. 

Marigolds could grow perennially in untilled fields, and their juice and flowers were reputed to have many benefits from soothing eye irritation to relieving tooth pain. Strawberry juice and wine were rumored to have similar benefits for the eyes, and, according to Estienne, the berries themselves had "no neede of greate toile or tilling". Modern researchers continue to study whether reduced tillage improves weed control and yield for strawberry plants.

Other plants found in the kitchen garden: asparagus, artichoke, sow thistle, endive, chicory, watercress, scallions, chives, parsnips, purslane, smallage, tarragon, borage, bugloss, radishes, rapeseed, skirret, poppy, mustard, cucumbers and gourds. 

Citrus and melons could be part of the kitchen garden also, if the conditions of soil and climate were such as to support their growth.

Modern potager garden

In some modern gardens, edible plants and especially herbs are planted alongside ornamental plants.  Fruit trees are one of the most common ways of doing this. The goal is to make the function of providing food aesthetically pleasing.

Plants are chosen as much for their functionality as for their color and form. Many are trained to grow upward. A well-designed potager can provide food as well as cut flowers and herbs for the home with very little maintenance. Potagers can disguise their function of providing for a home in a wide array of forms—from the cottage garden to the formality of a knot garden.

The owner of one of the Loire chateaux in France, the Château de Villandry decided many decades ago, to recreate a French formal garden with an elaborate geometrical scheme of beds surrounded by low hedges, but planted with kitchen garden plants (more recently the garden has been extended, the new areas mostly not planted with vegetables).  This striking scheme has been highly effective in turning the gardens into a tourist attraction, but is in no way historically authentic.

Vegetable garden

A vegetable garden (also known as a vegetable patch or vegetable plot) is a garden that exists to grow vegetables and other plants useful for human consumption, in contrast to a flower garden that exists for aesthetic purposes. It is a small-scale form of vegetable growing. A vegetable garden typically includes a compost heap, and several plots or divided areas of land, intended to grow one or two types of plant in each plot. Plots may also be divided into rows with an assortment of vegetables grown in the different rows. It is usually located to the rear of a property in the back garden or back yard. About a third of adults in the UK and America grow food in private or community kitchen or vegetable gardens. In World War II, many people had a "victory garden" which provided food and thus freed resources for the war effort.

With worsening economic conditions and increased interest in organic and sustainable living, many people are turning to vegetable gardening as a supplement to their family's diet. Food grown in the back yard consumes little if any fuel for shipping or maintenance, and the grower can be sure of what exactly was used to grow it. Organic horticulture, or organic gardening, has become increasingly popular for the modern home gardener.

Herb garden

The herb garden is often a separate space in the garden, devoted to growing a specific group of plants known as herbs. These gardens may be informal patches of plants, or they may be carefully designed, even to the point of arranging and clipping the plants to form specific patterns, as in a knot garden.

Herb gardens may be purely functional or they may include a blend of functional and ornamental plants. The herbs are usually used to flavour food in cooking, though they may also be used in other ways, such as discouraging pests, providing pleasant scents, or serving medicinal purposes (such as a physic garden), among others.

A kitchen garden can be created by planting different herbs in pots or containers, with the added benefit of mobility. Although not all herbs thrive in pots or containers, some herbs do better than others. Mint, a fragrant yet invasive herb, is an example of an herb that is advisable to keep in a container or it will take over the whole garden.

Some surviving walled kitchen gardens
These are open to the public.
Croome Court
Gibside, NT, some now used as volunteer allotments
Ham House, NT, mostly used for vegetables.
Clumber Park

See also
 List of garden types
 The Victorian Kitchen Garden, tv series
 Subsistence agriculture

Notes

References
Uglow, Jenny, A Little History of British Gardening, 2004, Chatto & Windus,

Further reading

 Davies, Jennifer (1987). The Victorian Kitchen Garden. London: BBC Books. .
 M. D. (1901) "Formation of the Fruit and Kitchen Garden", in: Thompson, Robert The Gardener's Assistant; new edition, revised ... under the direction and general editorship of William Watson. Vol. IV, pp. 1–32. London: Gresham Publishing Company.
 Shewell-Cooper, W. E. (1947) The A.B.C. of Vegetable Gardening London: English Universities Press (first published 1937).
 Wilson, C. A. (ed.) (1998). The Country House Kitchen Garden 1600–1950: How Produce Was Grown and How it Was Used. Sutton Publishing. .

External links

 Urban Leaf: A useful knowledge base for aspiring gardeners with a lot of information about getting started
 Kitchen Gardeners International: A nonprofit group promoting kitchen gardens worldwide
 Walled Kitchen Gardens Network
 Kitchen Gardens, Science Tracer Bullet, Library of Congress
 The History of Kitchen Gardens in America, Cornell University, Mann Library
 Herb Society of America
 National Herb Garden, United States National Arboretum
 Medicinal Herb Garden, University of Washington, USA

Organic gardening
Types of garden
Garden features